Wenche Sørum (born 10 July 1951) is a Norwegian middle distance runner. She was born in Oslo. She competed in 1,500 metres at the 1972 Summer Olympics in Munich, reaching the semi finals.

References

External links
 

1951 births
Living people
Athletes from Oslo
Norwegian female middle-distance runners
Olympic athletes of Norway
Athletes (track and field) at the 1972 Summer Olympics